This is a chronological list of sea-floods that have occurred in the Netherlands. In addition to these there have been hundreds of river floods during the centuries.

See also 
Flood control in the Netherlands

References

External links 
Christmas Day flood 1717 map
The Flood of 1953 in the Netherlands
Rome's Greatest Defeat, A Review – All Saints' Flood of 1170

 
Medieval weather events
Netherlands